Iron Sky: The Coming Race is a 2019 Finnish-German comic science fiction action film directed by Timo Vuorensola. The sequel to Vuorensola's 2012 film Iron Sky, its production was crowdfunded through Indiegogo. Like its predecessor, the film mixes political themes with repeated allusions to the popular culture and various conspiracy theories, but is generally more action-adventure oriented. A major inspiration of the content (and title) is the Vril conspiracy theory.

The plot follows a group of nuclear holocaust survivors living in an abandoned Nazi base on the far side of the Moon. Boarding a barely-functioning spacecraft, they travel to the nucleus of the hollow Earth in an attempt to recover the Holy Grail from a group of reptilian shape-shifters who are led by Tyrannosaurus-riding Adolf Hitler.

Produced on a budget of 17 million euros, The Coming Race is the most expensive Finnish live-action picture ever made. The production suffered from repeated delays and a two-part copyright dispute, with a Finnish court denying that copyright even existed in the subject matter of the case apart from one 3D model, the Japanese Ship. The second half of the case was a counterclaim by the production companies to sue the original Iron Sky 3D artists for continued use of their work. The court ruled that the production companies had not shown any evidence of copyright ownership themselves and dismissed the counterclaim.

The Coming Race was released on 16 January 2019 in Finland, but performed very poorly in the box office. Most reviews were negative, citing problems such as unidimensional characters, low-quality CGI, dated jokes, and confused script. The self-conscious ludicrousness of the storyline divided critics, with some finding it amusing while others criticized it as disorienting and unfunny. Lara Rossi's and Udo Kier's performances were praised by some reviewers.

Plot 

The year is 2047, 29 years after the nuclear war immediately following the battle between the Earth and Moon Nazis rendered the planet inhospitable. The last survivors have rallied together on "Neomenia", the former Moon Nazi base on the far side of the moon, struggling to coexist with the former Moon Nazis who also live in the base. Over the years, the base has started to deteriorate, due to overpopulation and the damage on the moon caused by the battle. Meanwhile, Jobsism, a cult formed around the teachings of Steve Jobs and their leader, Donald, has become the moon base's official religion.

Obi Washington, daughter of James Washington (who has since passed away) and Renate Richter, has spent her life keeping Neomenia's life support systems functional. While examining a Russian refugee ship, she encounters Wolfgang Kortzfleisch, the long-presumed-dead former Moonführer, who gives her Vrilia, the cure to Renate's terminal illness. When Renate's health is restored, Kortzfleisch reveals to Obi that he is a Vril, a race of Reptilians that arrived on Earth during the age of the dinosaurs. While studying the primates that emerged during prehistory, Kortzfleisch created humankind by injecting Vrilia into an apple and feeding it to his monkeys, Adam and Eve. The Vril have since gone underground to the center of the Earth once mankind had evolved. Kortzfleisch offers Obi a mission to travel to the subterranean city of Agartha and take the city's Vrilia to ensure the survival of her colony. Obi, along with the refugee ship's pilot, Sasha, security officer Malcolm, and the Jobsists, fly to Earth and crash in the Hollow Earth.

In Agartha, the Vril, who have been parading around as world leaders throughout history, kill the President of the United States for making the surface world uninhabitable. The Jobsists and Malcolm are captured by Steve Jobs and brought to Adolf Hitler, and Donald offers Hitler the whereabouts of Kortzfleisch in exchange for the Jobsists to live in Agartha, only for Hitler to betray them and have Jobs eat the Jobsists. Meanwhile, Obi and Sasha take the Holy Grail, the source of the Vrilia, but cause Agartha's sun to collapse and destroy the city. Malcolm escapes from captivity and rejoins Obi and Sasha before they fly back to Neomenia. Hitler launches the Vril spaceship out of Antarctica to follow them. Upon the trio's arrival, Kortzfleisch holds Renate hostage for Obi to surrender the Holy Grail, but Hitler and his tyrannosaurus, Blondi, invade the moon base. After drinking from the Holy Grail, a rejuvenated Renate confronts and kills Hitler, but is mortally wounded by Kortzfleisch. Obi, Sasha, Malcolm, and the surviving inhabitants escape in an old ship, but Kortzfleisch chases after them. Using Sasha's old Nokia 3310, Obi hacks into Donald's iPhone, triggering the self-destruct mechanism and destroying the Vril spaceship.

During dinner, Malcolm comes out as gay, but collapses and seemingly dies from allergens in the food. Both he and Renate are given a space funeral, but Malcolm suddenly gets out of his coffin, revealing that he only went into a short coma, a condition he has had since childhood. As the ship makes its long travel to Mars, Obi and Sasha express their love for each other.

In a mid-credit sequence, it is revealed that Mars has been colonized by the Soviet Union.

Cast 

 Lara Rossi as Obianaju "Obi" Washington
 Vladimir Burlakov as Sasha
 Kit Dale as Malcolm 
 Julia Dietze as Renate Richter
 Stephanie Paul as the President of the United States (a parody of Sarah Palin) who is secretly a Vril
 Tom Green as Donald
 Udo Kier as Wolfgang Kortzfleisch / Vril Adolf Hitler
 John Flanders as Gary the Base Commander
 James Quinn as Deputy Commander Johan
 Emily Atack as Tyler
 Martin Swabey as Ryan
 Pierce Baechler as the Altar Boy
 Christoph Drobig as the Guilty Jobsist
 Edward Judge as Fat Tyler
Kari Berg as Lena the Jobsist
 Victor Au as a Vril Officer
 Vasco De Beukelaer as the Vril Chairman
 Muya Lubambu Tshinioka as Vril  Idi Amin
 Antoine Plaisant as Vril Mark Zuckerberg
 Amanda Wolzak as  Vril Margaret Thatcher
 Francesco Italiano as Vril  Caligula
 Duta Skhirtladze as Vril Joseph Stalin
 Jukka Hilden as Vril Pope Urban II
 Abbas Shirafkan as Vril Osama bin Laden
 Kari Ketonen as Vril Vladimir Putin
 Hon Ping Tang as Vril Genghis Khan
 Lloyd Lai as Vril Kim Jong-un
 Tero Kaukomaa as Vril Urho Kekkonen
 Gaëtan Wenders as Vril Steve Jobs
 Alexander Moens as Vril Temple Guard
 Alan Lumb as Vril Temple Guard and Moonbase Citizen

Production 

On 20 May 2012, Tero Kaukomaa, producer of the first film, announced that there were plans for a prequel or a sequel but refused to disclose details. In May 2013, Vuorensola announced that Iron Sky would have a sequel titled Iron Sky The Coming Race. He also mentioned that unlike the first film, this installment would be completely funded by fans via Indiegogo, with an estimated budget of US$15 million. A promo video was shot for the 2014 Cannes Film Festival and the final draft of the script was scheduled to be published by the end of 2014. Filming was expected to begin in 2015. In July 2013, Vuorensola revealed Croatia as one of the proposed shooting locations. In February 2014, Dalan Musson signed in to write the screenplay. The Finnish Film Foundation and Medienboard Berlin-Brandenburg had come on board to finance the US$13 million project. On 5 November 2014, Iron Sky Universe launched another crowdfunding campaign to raise US$500,000 before 20 December. At the closing of the campaign on 5 January, contributors pledged a grand total of US$560,949.

On 22 November 2014, Lloyd Kaufman of Troma Entertainment confirmed having a cameo role in the film.

On 18 September 2015, Vuorensola announced that filming would commence at AED Studios in Belgium.

In October 2016, Timo Vuorensola launched a new crowdfunding campaign to fund special effects for out-of-budget scenes that were in danger of being left out from the final cut of the movie. The scenes included the deaths of reptilian Margaret Thatcher and Pope Urban II.

In the spring of 2017, the company responsible for the effects revised its cost calculations, and suddenly $2.5 million was missing from the film's budget. Due to the delay, one of the film’s major funders, Universal Studios, which was also one of the distributors of the first film, withdrew from the project, and the entire production had to be suspended. The project had to stand still for 1,5 years before it was finally completed in 2019 with Chinese funding.

Copyright dispute 

In the summer of 2017 a number of original Iron Sky VFX artists filed a suit in Finland against Iron Sky Universe Oy and Blind Spot Pictures Oy. "The plaintiffs claim their creative contribution to the Iron Sky franchise is such that they should also be considered as joint copyright holders of the original movie." In May 2018, the Finnish market court ruled that the artists have no copyright under sections 2, 6 and 46a of the Finnish copyright act in relation to Iron Sky and its material. The court awarded copyright to a single artist in the case of a Japanese ship design used in the film, but ruled that the copyright for only that ship had legally transferred to Blind Spot Pictures. In addition, the production companies filed a counterclaim asking the Finnish Market Courts to confirm that the VFX artists had no copyright in the films or in any material made by them and that the VFX artists had no right to use any material related to them. However, Finnish Market Courts rejected the production companies counterclaim.

Themes 

Like its predecessor, the movie refers to several motifs of post-war Esoteric Nazism, such as the Hollow Earth theory. The movie's title is a reference to Edward Bulwer-Lytton's novel The Coming Race (1871) that is commonly regarded as the origin of the so-called Vril myth. The film teaser features the Vril symbol that was designed by the Tempelhofgesellschaft in the 1990s.

Release 

Release was originally announced for 14 February 2018, but had been postponed to 22 August 2018 in Finland followed by the rest of the world soon after, if not the same time. However, according to reports in the Finnish press, the release date of 22 August 2018 had been cancelled. It was later announced that the film was scheduled to be released on 16 January 2019 as the Fan World Premiere in Helsinki, Finland.

Reception

Box office 

The film did not do well in the box office. In Finland, it had close to 32,000 viewers, less than one-fifth of the previous film. International total box office (excluding Finland) by July 2019 was less than US$400,000.

Critical response 

Following its premiere on January 16, 2019 in Helsinki, Finland, Iron Sky: The Coming Race attracted hostile reviews. Foreign reviews were generally negative as well.

Juho Typpö of Helsingin Sanomat called Iron Sky: The Coming Race an ”awfully bad movie”, awarding it one star out of five. The comedy built upon ”crazy and ludicrous twists” fails to entertain or amuse, and the entire film ends up being ”but a big joke” that provides the audience no reason to care. The potential of once-topical themes (such as Sarah Palin and Steve Jobs) was lost due to the prolonged production, and even the budget of 20 million — an all-time record for a Finnish live-action movie — was seemingly wasted, resulting in confined set-pieces and CGI of uneven quality. Jouni Vikman of Episodi also gave the film one star, criticizing ”old jokes that would not have been funny even if they were new”. The special effect sequences, supposedly the main attraction, were too brief to his tastes and ”reminiscent of a cheap TV-series”. He was impressed by Lara Rossi, especially considering the fact that many scenes were filmed in front of the green screen, whereas ”the veteran actors Udo Kier and Tom Green only manage to survive by ignoring their surroundings”. Jonni Aromaa from Yle News called Iron Sky: The Coming Race one of the worst films ever made, citing cardboard characters, subpar dialogue, unfunny humor, and low quality of the dinosaur effects. He was particularly critical of the screenplay: ”Why on earth was the script written by the American Dalan Musson, a friend of Vuorensola’s? Was it really so that no one else was available on this planet?”

Other reviews were more positive. Tapani Peltonen from V2 awarded Iron Sky: The Coming Race two stars out of five, describing the film as a ”wild and free” alternative to the homogenous mass of calculated Hollywood productions, but remarked that many such alternative productions struggle with even the very basics of filmmaking, failing to flesh out captivating characters. Helinä Laajalahti from Muropaketti gave the film three stars of out five and lauded it for its ambition. She, however, noted that ”the abundance of details and references embedded in the story threaten to turn against itself” and felt the film would have benefited from a more focused approach. Janne Kaakko of Aamulehti called the film a sequel that managed to be even more ”colorful, crackpot, and nerdy” than the original, giving it three stars out of five. Martta Kaukonen of Me Naiset likewise awarded the film three stars and said it was as entertaining as the original Iron Sky. She enjoyed the ”delicious” characterization and praised Kier's dual role.

Sophie Monks Kaufman of The Guardian gave the film one out of five stars, calling it a ”scattershot, stakes-free, self-consciously wacky space comedy”. She criticized its unidimensional characters and superficial script, noting a tendency to introduce illogical elements with little relation to the rest of the plot, seemingly for the sake of sheer surrealness. Nonetheless, Kaufman praised Lara Rossi's committed performance ”as a grounding presence in a gravity-free spectacle”. Noel Murray of Los Angeles Times called The Coming Race a ”goofy science-fiction picture”. He noted that the film repeatedly alludes to Russian interference in the 2016 United States elections and other provocative themes, but — not unlike its predecessor — remains unable to provide actual satire. Murray described The Coming Race ”frustratingly unfocused” both as a story and as a commentary of the modern era. Just the same, he found the hollow Earth sequence ”suitably wacky”. Joey Magidson of Hollywood News noted the potentially entertaining premise, but concluded that the film was ”largely a bore and a mess”. He awarded the film 1.5 stars out of 4. Brian Orndorf of Blu-ray.com called the film ”noisy and unfunny” and gave it 3 stars out of 10. Orndorf's criticisms included ”pawing at [...] obvious political targets” and ”relentless absurdity”.

On the other hand, Samantha Nelson, writing for The Verge, enjoyed the ”uniquely bizarre form of movie magic”. She found the film mostly void of the original's ”dark political comedy”, being more focused on campy adventure and absurd expositions delivered by Udo Kier. The storyline offers "plenty of opportunities for spectacle" and comedic commentary of film tropes, and the special effects show significant improvement over those in the first film. On the downside, The Coming Race’s high-speed plot prevents it from giving necessary focus on any single theme.

Aftermath and future of the franchise 

Before the film was released, a third film, called Iron Sky: The End Game, which would have made the Iron Sky films a trilogy, was in a planning stage.

During Autumn of 2019 there were many complaints from crowdfunding participants that Iron Sky Universe were not fulfilling their delivery of promised crowdfunding perks from the Indiegogo crowdfunding platform. Eventually, on November 5, 2019 Iron Sky Universe placed an update citing, "very challenging financial situation for the company", and saying that physical discs of the film may not actually be delivered at all. "However we can not make promises when the physical discs are coming, or if they're coming at all."

Blind Spot Pictures, the main production company for Iron Sky 2012 has been declared bankrupt since 17 September 2019.

During September 2020, Iron Sky 3D artist Trevor Baylis answered questions related to the future of the Iron Sky franchise on the Iron Sky "subreddit" r/ironsky and gave some insight to the legal problems behind the scenes using the username 'trevileo'. According to Baylis, due to the Finnish Market Courts failure to clarify copyright issues related to Iron Sky, this created a break in the Chain of title of copyright ownership documentation. Additionally, the situation was made worse by the Producers themselves failing to provide any evidence of copyright ownership to the courts which led to the Producers counterclaim being rejected.

Additionally, during the 2020 Helsinki Film Festival, Baylis took part in an Industry Panel related to film copyrights. Along with film producers and legal experts Baylis spoke about the contract problems associated with Iron Sky. In his comments he talks about how the Producers made a mistake of thinking there was a Work for hire doctrine in Finland when in fact, as mentioned by the expert panel, such a doctrine does not exist in Nordic countries as it mainly relates to United States law. Instead in Finland, employees can remain owners of copyrights. A salient fact as Baylis points out which contributed to both films distribution problems especially as many people worked without contracts creating 3D models for large parts of the first film's production.

Baylis concludes that because the producers do not have the complete chain of title for Iron Sky that it will be problematic to get legal distribution or raise funding for future projects.

Iron Sky Universe filed for bankruptcy 

Finnish news reported on 13 October 2020 that Iron Sky Universe, the production company behind Iron Sky franchise, had filed for bankruptcy in Finland. This was also confirmed by Iron Sky Universe the same day. Timo Vuorensola himself also confirmed that Iron Sky Universe had filed for bankruptcy saying, "The production company of Iron Sky, called Iron Sky Universe, one which I jointly set up with Tero, is going under."

References

External links 
 
 
 

2019 films
2019 science fiction action films
2019 action comedy films
Alternate Nazi Germany films
2010s science fiction comedy films
Crowdfunded films
Cultural depictions of Idi Amin
Cultural depictions of Adolf Hitler
Cultural depictions of Steve Jobs
Cultural depictions of Kim Jong-un
Cultural depictions of Osama bin Laden
Cultural depictions of Sarah Palin
Cultural depictions of Vladimir Putin
Cultural depictions of Joseph Stalin
Cultural depictions of Margaret Thatcher
Depictions of Genghis Khan on film
Films about dinosaurs
English-language Finnish films
Films about fictional presidents of the United States
Films directed by Timo Vuorensola
Films set in 2018
Films set in 2047
Films set in Antarctica
Films set in Washington, D.C.
Films shot in Belgium
Finnish science fiction films
Finnish alternate history films
2010s German-language films
Films about the Hollow Earth
Moon in film
Films about Nazis
Finnish political satire films
German political satire films
German post-apocalyptic films
Finnish post-apocalyptic films
Films about World War III
Films with screenplays by Dalan Musson
2010s English-language films
2010s German films